More Noise and Other Disturbances is the second studio album by the American band the Mighty Mighty Bosstones. It was released in 1992 by Taang! Records. It was a hit on college radio. "Where'd You Go" was released as a single.

Critical reception

The Washington Post wrote that the horns "are the most stylistically consistent thing on the album, which hops across a variety of bouncy or slamming genres, from the hardcore of 'Guns and the Young' to the hip-hop of 'Bad in Plaid'." The Deseret News deemed More Noise and Other Disturbances "a bristling mix of punk rock, rock, funk and ska."

Tiny Mix Tapes called the album, along with Question the Answers, "the band’s best work," and wrote that they both "[hold] up surprisingly well."

Track listing
"Awfully Quiet" (The Mighty Mighty Bosstones) – 3:08
"Where'd You Go" (Dicky Barrett, Nate Albert) – 3:26
"Dr. D" (Barrett, Joe Gittleman) – 2:01
"It Can't Hurt" (Barrett, Gittleman) – 2:28
"What's at Stake" – 2:53 (Originally by Slapshot)
"Cowboy Coffee" (Barrett, Gittleman) – 1:55
"I'll Drink to That" (Barrett, Gittleman) – 3:10
"Guns and the Young" (Barrett, Albert) – 2:22
"He's Back" (Barrett, Albert, Gittleman) – 3:12
"Bad in Plaid" (Barrett, Dennis Brockenborough) – 2:04
"They Came to Boston" (Barrett, Albert) – 3:30

Japan CD bonus track
"Sweet Emotion" – 2:52 (Originally by Aerosmith)
Previously available on Where'd You Go? EP.

Personnel
Dicky Barrett – lead vocals
Nate Albert – guitar, background vocals
Joe Gittleman – bass, background vocals
Tim "Johnny Vegas" Burton – saxophone
Kevin Lenear – saxophone
Dennis Brockenborough – trombone
Joe Sirois – drums
Josh Dalsimer – drums on tracks 2, 3, 6, 8 and 9
Tyler Oulin – trumpet
Paul Q. Kolderie  – producer, engineer
Steve Malone – assistant engineer
Frank Gaide – photography
Randy Hughes – photography
Mim Michelove – photography

References

The Mighty Mighty Bosstones albums
1992 albums
Taang! Records albums
Albums produced by Paul Q. Kolderie